In property law, a spite fence is an overly tall fence or a row of trees, bushes, or hedges, constructed or planted between adjacent lots by a property owner (with no legitimate purpose), who is annoyed with or wishes to annoy a neighbor, or who wishes to completely obstruct the view between lots. Several U.S. states and local governments have regulations to prohibit spite fences, or related regulations such as those establishing a maximum allowed height for fences. In the United Kingdom, the terms spite wall or blinder wall  (as in, to blind the view of a neighbour) are more commonly used.

Law
An overly tall fence may not be considered a spite fence by a court if there is some other reason for the fence which requires the extra height. In one case, a man built a  fence on his property, and his neighbor sued him. The man had put up a fence that tall because his neighbor kept throwing garbage over the old (shorter) fence. Since keeping garbage out of one's yard is a legitimate reason to have a fence, it was found not to be a spite fence.

Several states in the United States have laws that prohibit planting a row of trees parallel to a property line, which exceed  in height, which block a neighbor's view or sunlight. The courts have ruled that a row of trees can be considered a "fence".

Golf courses near residential communities will often have fences exceeding  in height in order to prevent struck balls from flying out of the course and into the windshields of cars and windows of houses near the course. Such fences are not spite fences, and may actually be required. Outdoor arenas and amphitheatres also often use fences or other obstructions to prevent the viewing of their events by those who do not have tickets (which, although it may be unpopular with those whose free viewing is obstructed, is not necessarily spiteful).

In civil-law countries, erecting a spite wall (or a spite house) is unequivocally prohibited because of the doctrine of abuse of rights: a right ends where abuse begins. This is mostly attributable to the fact that modern building regulations often prevent any construction likely to impinge on neighbours' views or privacy. In some countries, such as Finland, construction of any such structures is explicitly prohibited in the law (Neighbour Relations Act 13§).

Examples

California

Charles Crocker, a railroad investor and owner of a house on Nob Hill in San Francisco, built a high fence around his neighbor's house, spoiling his view, after the neighbor held out for many times the market value of the property. (Crocker had wanted to buy the whole block.)  The neighbor was a German undertaker called Nicolas Yung; Crocker was unsuccessful in purchasing the house until Yung had died. The height of the fence meant supporting buttresses had to be used.  The work features in the April 1878 panoramic photo of San Francisco by Eadweard Muybridge.

In the California case of Wilson v. Handley, 97 Cal. App. 4th 1301 (2002), Wilson built a second story onto her log cabin. Her neighbor, Handley, did not like this addition, and retaliated by planting a row of evergreen trees, parallel to the property line, that would grow some day to purposely block Wilson's view of Mount Shasta. Wilson sued Handley for blocking her view. The California Court of Appeals ruled that trees planted parallel to a property line, to purposely block a neighbors' view, constitutes a spite fence and a private nuisance, and is illegal under California Civil Code (Section 841.4). The court further noted that bushes or hedges exceeding  in height in California ( in other states) that block a neighbor's view are also a "spite fence" and a private nuisance.

Ireland
Marino Crescent, Dublin
The Jealous Wall in Belvedere House and Gardens

Pennsylvania

In the 1930s, an outfield fence on Shibe Park baseball stadium in Philadelphia was raised to 34 feet in order to block a view of the field from the rooftops of a neighboring street, which had become a popular site for spectators. The structure became known as "Connie Mack’s Spite Fence" after the home team's manager, and reduced the goodwill the team had had with its neighbors.

Utah
In 2008 a farmer in Hooper, Utah, placed three old cars upright in the ground, after a dispute with his neighbors, who objected to the flies, mosquitoes and dust from his farm yet also rejected his proposal to build a fence between their property and his farm.  The farmer described the construction as 'Redneck Stonehenge'.

United Kingdom
 The Manor House, Leg Square, Shepton Mallet, Somerset
 22 Gloucester Road, Thornbury, Bristol
 Stankelt Road, Silverdale, Lancashire

See also

Air rights
Nail house
Right to light

References

Further reading
 Statutory Regulation of Spite Fences in American Jurisdictions
 Spite Fences and Spite Wells: Relevancy of Motive in the Relations of Adjoining Landowners

Fences
Neighbourhoods